The 2022 Limerick Senior Hurling Championship was the 128th staging of the Limerick Senior Hurling Championship since its establishment by the Limerick County Board in 1887. The draws for the group stage pairings took place on 22 February 2022. The championship ran from 28 July to October 2022.

Kilmallock entered the championship as the defending champions. Blackrock were relegated after three years of top tier hurling.

The final was played on 30 October 2022 at the TUS Gaelic Grounds in Limerick, between Na Piarsaigh and Kilmallock, in what was their third ever meeting in the final and a first meeting in five years. Na Piarsaigh won the match by 3-23 to 2-15 to claim their seventh championship title overall and a first title in three years.

Ahane's Tom Morrissey was the championship's top scorer with 3-57.

Team changes

To Championship

Promoted from the Limerick Premier Intermediate Hurling Championship
 Mungret/St. Paul's

From Championship

Relegated to the Limerick Premier Intermediate Hurling Championship
 Monaleen

Fixtures and results

Group 1

Group 1 table

Group 1 fixtures and results

Group 2

Group 2 table

Group 2 fixtures and results

Knockout stage

Quarter-finals

Semi-finals

Final

Championship statistics

Top scorers

Overall

Miscellaneous

 Kildimo-Pallaskenry qualified for the knockout stages for the first time since 1937.
 South Liberties qualify for the semi-final for the first time since 1985.

References

Limerick Senior Hurling Championship
Limerick Senior Hurling Championship
Limerick Senior Hurling Championship